The Rameshwar temple is very old temple in Bhubaneswar, Odisha, India, and known as the Mausi Maa temple of Lingaraj Temple. It is located from 2 km distance from Lingaraj shrine.

Legend
Legend goes as when Rama was returning from Lanka after victory over Ravana, Goddess Sita asked to worship Shiva here. So Ramachandra built a Linga for that purpose.
Traditionally during Ashokashtami, which falls one day before to Rama Navami  in Chaitra Lord Lingaraja comes to this temple by a large chariot called Rukuna Rath and stays for four days. Historically the temple dates back to 9th century.

Images

See also
 List of temples in Bhubaneswar

References

External links
who is the aunt of Shiva, non other than The daughter of Mithila 

ancient  temples in bhubaneshwar
ashokastami in bhubaneshwar
ashokastami 

Hindu temples in Bhubaneswar
9th-century Hindu temples